Scherf is a German surname. Notable people with the surname include:

Charles Scherf (1917–1949), Australian flying ace of the Second World War
Henning Scherf (born 1938), German lawyer and politician

See also
Scherff
Sherf